Charles Eversfield (15 September1683 – 1749) of Denne Place, near Horsham, Sussex, was a British Tory politician who sat in the House of Commons between 1705 and 1747.

Early life
Eversfield was the only son. of Nicholas Eversfield of Charlton Court, near Steyning, Sussex and his wife, Elizabeth Gildridge, daughter of Nicholas Gildridge of Eastbourne, Sussex. In 1684, he succeeded to the estates of his father. He married  Mary Duncombe, daughter of Henry Duncombe of Weston, Surrey on 21 July 1702.

Career

In 1695, Eversfield inherited the estate of Denne from his uncle Anthony Eversfield and with it an electoral interest at Horsham.  As soon as he came of age, he successfully contested Horsham at the 1705 English general election, being   listed as a ‘Churchman’. He was relatively inconspicuous in his first Parliament but voted against the Court candidate for Speaker on 25 October 1705. He was returned again for Horsham, as a Tory at the 1708 British general election. He acted as a teller on 8 March 1709 against the election of Thomas Meredyth for Midhurst and voted against the impeachment of Dr Sacheverell in 1710. At the 1710 British general election, he was returned for both Horsham and for Sussex and chose to sit for Sussex. In this Parliament he was one of the spokesmen for the October Club. He obtained a place as Paymaster and treasurer of Ordnance in 1712. He was returned again at the 1713 but lost  his place as Paymaster on George I's accession in 1714.

At the  1715 British general election, he was defeated at Sussex  and was unseated on petition at  Horsham on 16 June 1715. He was therefore left without a seat. He came to an agreement with his opponents, the Ingrams, to share the representation of Horsham and  he was returned there unopposed at a by-election on 12 June 1721. He was returned for Horsham at the 1722 British general election and went over to the Government. He spoke for them in an army debate on 26 October 1722. He was returned again For Horsham in 1727 and 1734. He then voted regularly with the government and helped the Duke of Newcastle in county elections.  In 1737 he sold his burgages at Horsham to the Ingrams, and in 1741  was returned as MP for  Steyning, continuing to vote with the Government. He was classed as an Old Whig in 1746, and did not stand in 1747.

Later life and legacy
Eversfield  made a second marriage on 9 August 1731, to Henrietta Maria Lady Jenkinson, widow of Sir Robert Jenkinson, 3rd Baronet and daughter of Charles Scarborough of Windsor, Berkshire. He died on 17 June 1749 leaving a son and four daughters by his first wife and two illegitimate daughters. His eldest son Charles succeeded to a baronetcy created for Henry Fermor.

References

1683 births
1749 deaths
Members of the Parliament of Great Britain for English constituencies
British MPs 1710–1713
British MPs 1713–1715
British MPs 1715–1722
British MPs 1722–1727
British MPs 1727–1734
British MPs 1734–1741
British MPs 1741–1747